Aechmea sphaerocephala is a species of flowering plant in the Bromeliaceae family. It is endemic to southeastern Brazil, known from the States of Espírito Santo and Rio de Janeiro.

References

sphaerocephala
Flora of Brazil
Plants described in 1843
Taxa named by Charles Gaudichaud-Beaupré
Taxa named by John Gilbert Baker